George Czerwinski was a member of the Wisconsin State Assembly and the Wisconsin State Senate.

Biography
Czerwinski was born on September 19, 1890, in Milwaukee, Wisconsin. He became a contractor for the building of city streets.

Political career
Czerwinski represented the 8th district of the Senate from 1921 to 1924. Previously, he was elected to the Assembly in 1918. He was a Republican.

References

Politicians from Milwaukee
Republican Party Wisconsin state senators
Republican Party members of the Wisconsin State Assembly
1890 births
Year of death missing